The Forest Protection Service, later the Forest Protection Corps, was an armed and uniformed paramilitary force created by the General Government which was responsible for defending forests in Poland from sabotage and for patrolling forests to prevent their use by the Polish resistance. It was formed in 1939 and largely composed of ethnic German residents of Poland.

See also 
 Blue Police

References 

Forest protection service
Government agencies established in 1939
Environment and heritage law enforcement agencies
Police of Nazi Germany
Police units of Nazi Germany